Bradley Snedeker (born September 18, 1977) is an American actor, mostly appearing on television.

Life and career
Snedeker was born in Denver, Colorado. He has appeared in several television series since 2002, including Angel, JAG, NCIS, Cold Case, Drake & Josh, Reba, The Closer, along with many others.

Snedeker appeared in the TV film I Married Who?, along with co-star Kellie Martin. The film aired on the Hallmark Movie Channel on July 21, 2012.

In 2007, he made his film debut in The Pink Conspiracy.

References

External links

1977 births
American male film actors
American male television actors
Living people
Male actors from Denver